Arp High School is a public high school located in Arp, Texas (USA) and classified as a 3A school by the UIL.  It is part of the Arp Independent School District located in far southeastern Smith County.  In 2015, the school was rated "Met Standard" by the Texas Education Agency.

Athletics
The Arp Tigers compete in these sports - 

Cross Country, Volleyball, Football, Basketball, Golf, Track, Softball & Baseball

Basketball coach Guy Lewis, an alumnus of the school, was on the basketball and football teams while a student there in the 1930s.

State titles 
Arp (UIL)

2006(2A) Boys Basketball
2007 (2A) Boys  Track
Semi-Finalist 
2000 (2A) Football 
2001 (2A) Football 
2016 (3A) Football
State finalist 
2008 (2A) Boys Basketball 
Arp Industrial (PVIL)
State Championship 

1949 Basketball (1A) PVIL 
1965 Basketball (1A) PVIL

References

External links 
Arp Independent School District

Schools in Smith County, Texas
Public high schools in Texas